Anneliese Louise van der Pol (born September 23, 1984) is a Dutch-born American actress and singer. She is known for her theatre work, and for starring as Chelsea Daniels on the Disney Channel series That's So Raven (2003–2007) and its spin-off Raven's Home (2017–2021, 2023). Her films include the musical comedy film Bratz (2007), the spoof film Vampires Suck (2010), and the international-production 5 Weddings (2017). Van der Pol has recorded several songs for The Walt Disney Company, including "Over It" for the Stuck in the Suburbs soundtrack, which debuted on August 7, 2004, at number 182 on the Billboard 200.

Life and career

Early life and work 
Van der Pol was born in Naaldwijk, South Holland, to Willem van der Pol, who is Dutch and the director of the Physical Plant at the California State University in Fullerton, California, and Dyan Ross, an American from Brooklyn, New York. Van der Pol's mother named her after Anne Frank after visiting the house where Frank hid (van der Pol's mother is Jewish). Anneliese has two older sisters, Rachel and Sarah. Van der Pol's family moved to the United States when she was three years old, and she retains dual American and Dutch citizenship.

Van der Pol attended School in Bellflower, California, where she began acting in third grade at Washington Elementary School. She attended Bellflower Middle School and High School, then transferred and subsequently graduated from the acclaimed Orange County High School of the Arts in Santa Ana, California.

In 1999, Van der Pol played Sandy Dumbrowsky in the Huntington Beach Playhouse revival of Grease, which earned her a Bobbi Award for "Best Actress in a Musical." She played Eva Perón in the Buena Park Civic Theatre production of Evita in 1999 and received positive reviews from the Los Angeles Times. At the age of fifteen, she is also the youngest actress in theatrical history to play the role in a professional production. Van der Pol subsequently starred as "Laurey" in an Austin, Texas, musical theatre production of Oklahoma! from 2000 to 2001. Her performance earned her both an Austin Critics Table Award nomination for "Best Actress in a Musical" and a B. Iden Payne Nomination for "Best Featured Actress in a Musical". Van der Pol graduated from the Orange County High School of the Arts in 2002.

2000s 
In 2001, she was cast as Chelsea Daniels, the best friend of the title character played by Raven-Symoné on Disney Channel's That's So Raven, a role which she portrayed all throughout the show's run. Just as the first season of That's So Raven began, she went back to Austin Musical Theatre to perform in "Celebrate: AMT," a performance highlighting all the shows the company had done up to then. She was a featured soloist. In 2006, Van der Pol also appeared on the very first instalment of the Disney Channel Games as a member of the Red Team; her teammates were Zac Efron, Kay Panabaker, Dylan Sprouse, Shin Koyamada, and Moises Arias. She also played Heather in a guest starring role on Kim Possible in the episode "And the Mole-Rat Will Be CGI."

As the popularity of That's So Raven grew, Disney showcased van der Pol's musical talents by signing her for several music compilations. She even performed a solo in one episode, "Alone in the Hallways." In 2004, she recorded the song "Over It" for the Disney Channel Original Movie Stuck in the Suburbs which became the soundtrack's lead single. Her second solo recording, called "A Day in the Sun," a cover originally sung by Hilary Duff, appeared on the album That's So Raven Too!. Van der Pol has been associated with several other Disney music projects, including the Elton John song "Circle of Life" for a special edition of The Lion King DVD, "A Dream Is a Wish Your Heart Makes" for the Cinderella: Special Edition DVD, and "Candle on the Water" from Pete's Dragon on DisneyMania 4.

Van der Pol was arrested for DUI in Los Angeles on July 10, 2006. She had a blood-alcohol level of 0.19, more than twice the legal limit in California. Police said she swerved and hit a parked car, which caused the parked car to hit two others. Van der Pol later pleaded no contest to two misdemeanors. She was sentenced in 2007 and was ordered to go on probation for 36 months, as well as pay fines and assessments, and attend an alcohol education program. The probation ended in 2010.

Anneliese also had a supporting role in Bratz: The Movie as Avery, a mean popular girl and best friend to the main antagonist.

In February 2007, it was announced that Van der Pol would be making her Broadway debut as Belle, in Beauty and the Beast. Van der Pol was the musical's 17th (and final) Belle. She played the role from April 3, 2007, to July 29, 2007, as the show reached its 5,464th (and final) performance. During her run as Belle, Van der Pol also performed at Bryant Park's Broadway in Bryant Park on July 12, 2007, along Beauty and the Beast co-stars Chris Hoch and Jeanne Lehmann, performing songs from the show. Prior to Beauty'''s final show, van der Pol appeared on Live with Regis and Kelly for a small interview discussing her Broadway debut and experiences with the show. She also discussed the origins of her name, and performed Beautys "A Change in Me."

In May 2008, it was revealed that Van der Pol would play the role of Kathy in the new musical, Vanities, A New Musical. She originated the role of Kathy during the musical's Broadway previews in Pasadena, California from August 22, 2008, to September 28, 2008. Originally, the musical was scheduled to begin performances on Broadway February 2, 2009, at the Lyceum Theatre with an official opening on February 26, 2009, but the show's Broadway run was postponed due to the economic turmoil in the US and to focus on the future of the musical. The show then made its New York City debut Off-Broadway at the Second Stage Theatre on July 2, 2009, in previews, and officially opened on July 16, 2009. Performances continued through August 9, 2009. On August 21, 2009, she started recording the Original Cast Album for the musical alongside Lauren Kennedy and Sarah Stiles. The album was later released with Sh-k-Boom Records on December 15, 2009.

As of July 2009, she stated she had received her fourth call-back for the role of Glinda in Wicked on Broadway. Van der Pol appeared in a twelve part Jewish miniseries revival of Shalom Sesame (the Jewish version of Sesame Street). The series premiered during the Hanukkah holiday in December 2010.

In September 2009, Van der Pol starred as Esther Smith in the Theatre Under The Stars production of Meet Me in St. Louis that had a limited run from September 29 to October 11, 2009.Theatre Under the Stars Meet Me in St. Louis  In December 2009, Van der Pol made a guest appearance on The Battery's Down, as Rhonda Busby Smith. The episode premiered on December 1, 2009, on YouTube, where the web-series ran for two seasons.

 2010s 
Van der Pol starred in Jason Friedberg and Aaron Seltzer's spoof film, Vampires Suck, based on the Twilight series. Van der Pol plays the role of Jennifer, Becca's new best friend. The film's trailer exclusively premiered on Break.com on July 7, 2010, featuring Anneliese's character introducing the cast of Jersey Shore. To promote the film, Van der Pol made appearances during New York Comic Con weekend for meet-and-greets with fans and to join a live discussion panel for Vampires Suck, along with co-star Matt Lanter. She also participated in a fashion pictorial tribute to teen films for Zooey Magazine. The pictorial was shot by David Nguyen and paid tribute to Pretty Woman, Romy and Michele's High School Reunion, 10 Things I Hate About You, The Princess Diaries, and Legally Blonde.

Van der Pol appeared in the thriller film, Cats Dancing on Jupiter, alongside Amanda Righetti and Jonathan Bennett. Van der Pol returned to television as a guest star in NBC's television series, Friends with Benefits. Van der Pol also returned to the Disney Channel in a guest starring role on Shake It Up, as Ronnie, a former dancer of Shake It Up Chicago! The episode, "Reunion It Up!" premiered on April 10, 2011.

Van der Pol had been cast as "Fiona MacLeod" in Arthur Kopit and Anton Dudley's "A Dram of Drummhicit", a Scottish play presented by La Jolla Playhouse. The Scottish play started previews May 17, 2011, in San Diego. On April 24, Van der Pol announced that she would not be continuing with the production, due to artistic differences between herself and the play's director.

In September 2011, Van der Pol was cast to perform in For the Record: Tarantino in Concert, conceived and directed by Shane Scheel and Christopher Lloyd Bratten. The show featured songs and scenes from the films of Quentin Tarantino, including Pulp Fiction and Inglourious Basterds, and ran from September 29 to November 12. Van der Pol continued to be part of the 'For the Record' series throughout 2012 with For the Record: John Hughes, For the Record: Baz Luhrmann and again in For the Record: Tarantino in Concert. She went on to record the production's first cast recording, For the Record: Tarantino which was released through LML Music on November 13, 2012.

From April to May 2012, she starred as Marian Almond in the Pasadena Playhouse production of The Heiress.

She played the lead role in the Arizona Theatre Company's production of Paul Gordon's new musical, Emma, which ran from December 1, 2012, to January 20, 2013. She returned to the Arizona Theatre Company in Stephen Wrentmore's production of The Importance of Being Earnest as Gwendolyn Fairfax. The show ran in Tucson from September 14, 2013, through October 5, 2013, and in Phoenix from October 10, 2013, through October 27, 2013.

Van der Pol appeared in an industry reading for the highly anticipated Ghostlight, A New Musical, as the central role of Olive Thomas, in New York. Van der Pol was joined by Robert Cuccioli, Rachel Bay Jones, Jennifer Hope Wills, Trevor McQueen, and Kimberly Faye Greenberg. In July 2014, she played Millie Dillmount in the Will Rogers Memorial Center production of Thoroughly Modern Millie.Room for One More?  theaterjones.com, July 1, 2014

On November 14, 2016, it was reported that Van der Pol would reprise her role as Chelsea Daniels for the second That's So Raven spin-off series Raven's Home'', which premiered on July 21, 2017. She was a main cast member for the first four seasons.

Filmography

Film

Television

Stage

Discography

Cast recordings

Selected soundtracks and miscellaneous

Awards and nominations

References

External links 
 
 Anneliese van der Pol on Instagram
 Anneliese van der Pol on Twitter

Year of birth missing (living people)
Living people
20th-century American actresses
20th-century Dutch actresses
21st-century American actresses
21st-century Dutch actresses
Actresses from California
American child actresses
American film actresses
American musical theatre actresses
American sopranos
American television actresses
American people of Dutch-Jewish descent
Dutch emigrants to the United States
Dutch Jews
Dutch film actresses
Dutch musical theatre actresses
Dutch sopranos
Dutch television actresses
Jewish American actresses
People from Bellflower, California
People from Naaldwijk
20th-century American singers
21st-century American singers
American child singers
Orange County School of the Arts alumni
20th-century American women singers
21st-century American women singers
21st-century American Jews